Xiao Zhi (蕭寘) (died 865) was an official of the Chinese dynasty Tang Dynasty, briefly serving as a chancellor during the reign of Emperor Yizong.

Very little is known about Xiao Zhi's career.  His family descended from the imperial house of Liang Dynasty and had a number of members who served as chancellor during Tang Dynasty, including his great-great-grandfather Xiao Song and his grandfather Xiao Fu.  However, he had no biography in either of the official histories of Tang, the Old Book of Tang and the New Book of Tang — although the New Book of Tang noted in his grandfather Xiao Fu's biography:

In any case, it is known that as of 864, Xiao Zhi was serving as the deputy minister of defense (兵部侍郎, Bingbu Shilang) and the director of taxation, when Emperor Yizong gave him the designation Tong Zhongshu Menxia Pingzhangshi (同中書門下平章事), making him a chancellor de facto.  Xiao Zhi served as chancellor until his death in 865.  Xiao Zhi's son Xiao Gou later served as a chancellor during the reign of Emperor Yizong's son Emperor Xizong.

Notes and references 

 Zizhi Tongjian, vol. 250.

865 deaths
Chancellors under Emperor Yizong of Tang
Year of birth unknown